Omorgus ciliatus is a species of hide beetle in the subfamily Omorginae.

References

ciliatus
Beetles described in 1846